The Tromyogan is a river in Khanty-Mansi Autonomous Okrug, Russia, a tributary of the Ob.

Course 
The Tromyogan is a right tributary of the Ob river. It has its sources in the Siberian Uvaly. The river flows to the north of the Vatinsky Yogan basin.

Tributaries  

See also
List of rivers of Russia

References

External links 
 Article in the Great Soviet Encyclopedia

Rivers of Khanty-Mansi Autonomous Okrug
Central Siberian Plateau